Casino San Pablo is a Native American reservation with a gambling hall located in San Pablo, California. It is operated by the Lytton Band of Pomo Indians. It is adjacent to the site of the now demolished Doctors Medical Center. The former medical center was sold to the tribe in 2017.

History
The site, formerly a trailer park and the Lucky Lanes bowling alley, was converted into parking and a card club in 1994. Later in 2002, restricted gambling was permitted. The casino shares its revenues with the city of San Pablo (7%) where it forms the city's economic backbone.

In 2005 the casino was expanded into a "full-fledged" casino with slot machines and video bingo. However, by 2016 the workers who were making an average of $12 an hour were complaining that it was too low with the salaries at nearby Oaks Card Club being $14 and Graton Casino also hovering around $14 and thus asked for a 12% wage hike. In 2014 the casino was making an estimated $277 million annually. Nevertheless the tribe of 350 people was reported to be paying its unionized employees $9.50 an hour on average just 5 years earlier.

Loni Hancock opposed adding the video bingo machines because she said that they look and feel like real slot machines and that technology has brought in a loophole and it would bring more traffic and crime to the area.

In 2018 a man that had arranged for a sexual encounter at the casino was attacked and had his car stolen by a man and woman in the parking lot of the gaming hall. Furthermore in 2018 the tribe donated $1 million to a fund to support the victims of the Camp Fire.

In 2019 patrons of the casino were followed home and robbed at gunpoint across the bay in South San Francisco. Also in 2019 the casino bought the former hospital site for $13.5 million and razed it to expand parking by 1,000 spaces. It was believed this would alleviate parking in the surrounding neighborhoods and be of economic benefit to the city of San Pablo, which receives over 50% of its funding from casino revenues.

In 2019, with the help of congressman Jared Huffman, the tribe was seeking to establish a non-gambling homeland adjacent to Windsor in Sonoma County. The plans are to build housing, a resort hotel, and a winery on a 500-acre site. It is known as the Lytton Rancheria Homelands Act.

Also in 2019 a Daly City woman won nearly $781,000 in a jackpot from a slot machine here.

Notes

External links

San Pablo, California
Casinos in California
Native American casinos
1994 establishments in California
Casinos completed in 1994
Native American history of California